Thomas John Malloy (born December 8, 1974) is an American actor and filmmaker based in Los Angeles, California.

Career
Malloy wrote, produced and acted in The Alphabet Killer, a psychological thriller directed by Rob Schmidt and starring Eliza Dushku, Cary Elwes, Timothy Hutton and Michael Ironside; and The Attic, a thriller directed by Mary Lambert and starring John Savage, Jason Lewis, and Elisabeth Moss. He has written, produced and starred in the 2009 film Love N' Dancing, a dance film/romantic comedy directed by Rob Iscove that stars Amy Smart, Billy Zane, Betty White and Rachel Dratch.

Malloy has acted in other films, including Gravesend, and on television shows including Law & Order, Third Watch and Kidnapped.

He wrote the book Bankroll: A New Approach To Financing Feature Films in 2009. A 2nd Edition of the book came out in 2012.

In 2013, Malloy partnered with LA based independent film producer Jason Brubaker to create The Film Finance Guide.

Personal life
Malloy was born in Red Bank, New Jersey and raised in the Whitehouse Station section of Readington Township, New Jersey. He is a graduate of Hunterdon Central Regional High School, where he acted in school performances with classmate Vera Farmiga, and of Montclair State University (1993–1997). For 10 years, Malloy gave motivational speeches at schools nationwide.

Filmography

References

External links

Tom Malloy: A Vision in Motion

1974 births
Living people
American male film actors
American male television actors
Film producers from California
Hunterdon Central Regional High School alumni
Montclair State University alumni
Male actors from Los Angeles
Male actors from New Jersey
People from Readington Township, New Jersey
People from Red Bank, New Jersey
Film producers from New Jersey